Enrique Alba is a professor of computer science at the University of Málaga, Spain.

Overview
Alba achieved his Ph.D. degree on designing and analyzing parallel and distributed genetic algorithms. His current research interests involve the design and application of evolutionary algorithms, ant colony optimization, particle swarm optimization, and other bio-inspired systems to real problems including telecommunications, software engineering, combinatorial optimization, and bioinformatics among others. The main focus of all his work is on parallel metaheuristics and multiobjective optimization for complex problems.

Work
Prof. Alba leads the NEO (Networking and Emerging Optimization) group at the University of Málaga, Spain.

His ongoing research includes the fields of ad hoc metropolitan network optimization, optimal design of GSM networks, logistics, vehicle routing, natural language tagging, software engineering, DNA fragment assembly, gene microarrays, cutting/packing, software testing and validation, and in general combinatorial problems lying in the base of real-world problems. New fields like multiobjective techniques with high scalability, grid/P2P/Internet platforms, dynamic optimization of problems whose definition change in time, and heterogeneous algorithms are dealt with as part both of basic and applied research. He has been involved in many projects and Ph.D. theses dealing with the construction and utilization of vehicular ad hoc networks, as well as has started a whole line of research in Bio-inspired techniques, and metaheuristics for smart cities.

As for techniques, Alba and his group are dealing mainly with metaheuristics, either bio-inspired or not, and also hybridization with other (possibly exact) methods. Specifically, genetic algorithms, particle swarm, ant colonies, simulated annealing, branch and bound, differential evolution, variable neighbourhood search, and related solvers are used.
 
Prof. Alba has published seven books on metaheuristics and bio-inspired techniques, more than 130 papers indexed in ISI impact journals, and more than 300 conference papers. He has coordinated several Spanish national research projects like TRACER, OPLINK, M*, DIRICOM, roadME, moveON, 6city, ECO-IOT,. His work has achieved internationalization via his participation in bilateral projects with INRIA like PERFOM, MOID, Robust&Green, and European CELTIC projects like CARLINK, FP7 COADVISE, fiQare, and TAILOR. He holds active collaborations by joining publications and exchanges with more than 20 international universities and labs, and his research in Málaga is also innovating with industrial transferences to several companies including TARTEC S.A., OPTIMI, Arelance, NOVASOFT, ETRA I+D, Moviquity, VTT, Synergiums, EMERGYA, SECMOTIC, ACTECO, EUROSOTERRADOS, TORCAL, JUMA and others.
 
Alba works in the program committee of leading conferences in several fields, including ACM GECCO, IEEE CEC, PPSN, EvoStar, IPDPS, as well as organizing international events frequently. He also works as a reviewer for the IEEE Transactions Journals on Evolutionary Computation, Education, and Parallel and Distributed Systems. Besides, he is an active reviewer for SMC, JPDC, PARCO, Journal of Heuristics, JMMA, EJOR, Computer Communications, MIT Evolutionary Computation, Software: Practice and Experience, and Information Sciences.

According to Google Scholar, as of 2022 he has an h-index of 65 and more than 19,000 citations to his work.

From September 2021 Prof. Alba is seconded to Brussels to work in the European Research Council (ERC) for managing funds for supporting computer science in Europe and around the world.

See also
 Parallel Metaheuristics
 Cellular Evolutionary Algorithms
 Metaheuristics
 Evolutionary Algorithm
 Swarm Intelligence
 Optimization
 Machine Learning

References

Further reading
 DIRICOM project 2008–2012

 06/06/2010 - Andalusian macro-group excels in research at National level
 20/04/2010- EPOCA – Science and Health: Wind Farms after Darwin
 07/02/2010- EPOCA – Science and Health: Internet on Wheels
 12/01/2010- EMARTV – Radio Interview to Profesor Alba

External links
 Enrique Alba home page

1968 births
Living people
People from the Province of Málaga

Spanish computer scientists
Academic staff of the University of Málaga